The First Law is a fantasy series written by British author Joe Abercrombie. The First Law is the title of the original trilogy in the series, but is also used to refer to the series as a whole. The full series consists of a trilogy, three stand-alone novels, short stories, and a second trilogy, titled The Age of Madness, of which the third book was published in September 2021.

The original trilogy is published by Gollancz in the UK and Pyr in the United States. The stand-alone novels remain with Gollancz in the UK but will be published by Orbit Books in the United States.

Published works

Short stories

Chronology of events 
All fictional dates are in relation to the founding of The Union; Before the Union (BU) or After the Union (AU). The Original Trilogy story arc (with characters Logen Ninefingers, Jezal dan Luthar, Sand dan Glokta, Dogman, Collem West and Ferro Maljinn):

 566 AU (spring): "A Beautiful Bastard" (short story)
 570 AU (summer): "Made a Monster" (short story)
 575 AU (spring-autumn): The Blade Itself (1st novel in the trilogy)
 575-576 AU (autumn-spring): Before They Are Hanged (2nd novel in the trilogy)
 576 AU (spring): "Hell" (short story)
 576-577 AU (summer to winter): Last Argument of Kings (3rd novel in the trilogy)

The Best Served Cold story arc (with characters Monza Murcatto, Nicomo Cosca, Castor Morveer, Friendly, Caul Shivers and Cas Shenkt):

 579-80 AU: Best Served Cold (novel)
 580 AU: "Wrong Place, Wrong Time" (short story)

The Heroes story arc (with characters Bremer dan Gorst, Prince Calder, Curnden Craw, Finree dan Brock, Tunny and Beck):

 574 AU (autumn): "The Fool Jobs" (short story)
 584 AU (autumn): "Yesterday, Near a Village Called Barden" (short story)
 584 AU: The Heroes (novel)

The Red Country story arc (with characters Shy South, Lamb, Ro South and Temple):

 584 AU (summer): "Some Desperado" (short story)
 590 AU (summer): "Freedom!" (short story)
 590 AU: Red Country (novel)

The Shevedieh, Javre and Carcolf story arc:

 573 AU (autumn): "Small Kindnesses" (short story)
 575 AU (summer): "Skipping Town" (short story)
 576 AU (summer): "Two's Company" (short story)
 587 AU (autumn): "Three's a Crowd" (short story)
 592 AU (spring): "Tough Times All Over" (short story)

The Age of Madness Trilogy story arc (with characters Leo dan Brock, Savine dan Glokta, Orso dan Luthar, Rikke, Gunnar Broad, Vick dan Teufel and Jonas Clover), begins in 605 AU:
 A Little Hatred (1st novel in the trilogy)
 The Trouble With Peace (2nd novel in the trilogy)
 The Wisdom of Crowds (3rd novel in the trilogy)

Book titles 
The titles of the works derive from various sources, including real-world quotes or phrases, and in-world references.

The title of the original trilogy is a reference to a law put forth by the legendary half-Demon Euz from the series, which stated, "It is forbidden to touch the Other Side direct," the Other Side being the realm of Demons, from which magic power derives.

Setting
The First Law series is set in an epic fantasy world at war, reminiscent of medieval-era Europe and the greater Mediterranean world. Long ago, the world was inhabited by both Demons and Humans. Then, hundreds, or thousands, of years ago, in the Old Time, a legendary half-Demon, half-Human with great magical powers, named Euz, banished the Demons from the world. Magic still exists, which relies on connections to the Other Side, where the Demons live. However, Euz left behind the First Law: "It is forbidden to touch the Other Side direct."

 The Union contains the provinces of Angland, the Midderlands, Dagoska, Starikland and the city of Westport in Styria. It is a powerful kingdom reminiscent of Western and Central Europe, particularly the Holy Roman Empire.
 The Gurkish Empire is a sprawling empire to the south of the Union, similar to the large Middle-Eastern empires of antiquity.
 The North is referred to as such not only by The Union (for whom it really is to the north) but also by those who live there, who refer to themselves as Northmen.
 Styria is a large island continent to the east of the Union containing multiple warring city states and factions.
 The Old Empire is a former world power to the west of the Union, now reduced to a patchwork of squabbling warlords all vying for the throne.
 Far Country is a near lawless frontier region to the north of the Old Empire and west of Starikland province.

The books of the trilogy do not contain maps, as Abercrombie prefers not to use them. However, the three stand-alone novels do contain their own local maps and a World map was finally produced in full on the cover of the Sharp Ends short story collection.

Plot overview

The First Law 
The plot of the original trilogy involves three major powers: The Union, the Gurkish Empire, and the North, recently united under King Bethod.

There are two major theaters of war. The first takes place in the north between the Union and the Northmen, who invade the Union's northern province of Angland. The second is in the south between the Union and the Gurkish Empire, who attempt to annex the Union city of Dagoska. The trilogy centers on the fortunes of a variety of characters as they navigate through these and other conflicts. The trilogy follows the stories of six point-of-view characters, whose paths often intersect.

The Blade Itself 
The first book introduces the three main characters of the trilogy and three secondary ones. Logen Ninefingers is a warrior who earned a fearsome reputation helping to bring Bethod to power in the North, but has since fallen out with him. Logen and his small crew of friends flee after being attacked by Shanka creatures. Logen is separated from his crew, and sets off on his own path. He meets Bayaz, a powerful centuries-old Magus, who enlists Logen's help in accompanying him to Adua. Sand dan Glokta leads an Inquisition investigation into a bribery case, which leads to him uncovering a wider corruption among the merchants. His superiors divert him into investigating Bayaz. Jezal, a vain young nobleman who has become a Union army officer due to his connections, trains for a prestigious swordfighting tournament. He falls in love with Ardee, the sister of his superior Collem, and wins the tournament with help from Bayaz. At a celebration banquet, Bayaz is challenged to prove who he is by entering the House of the Maker. The main characters of the book converge in accompanying Bayaz into the building. Bayaz retrieves an artifact and announces his plan to retrieve the Seed, a powerful magical artifact that can help him take on Khalul and the Gurkish Empire. The book also follows the journey of Logen's companions, led by Dogman, to warn Bethod about the Shanka, and Ferro, an escaped Gurkish slave who travels with another Magus to find Bayaz.

Before They Are Hanged 
The book follows three distinct sets of characters as war breaks out on two fronts. In the south, Sand dan Glokta and his inquisitors attempt to repel a Gurkish invasion of the city of Dagoska, the Union's sole possession on the continent, won some decades earlier at great cost. In the North, the book follows Colonel West and the Northmen as they attempt to deal with Bethod, who intends to force the Union out of Angland, their principal northern possession. Finally, the book follows Logen Ninefingers and his companions as they journey into the far west of their world with the sorcerer Bayaz, First of the Magi, seeking out a powerful and dangerous ancient artifact known as the Seed. The book makes it explicit that all these events are interconnected and part of the greater machinations of a sorcerer called Khalul, Second of the Magi and one of Bayaz's enemies. Khalul has raised a great army of slaves and Eaters (cannibalistic transformed humanoids with enhanced durability and magical abilities), and has indirectly given Bethod an alliance with the Flatheads, orc-like creatures created as weapons in an ancient war, as well as a man known as the Feared, who is supernaturally all but immune to damage. The story ends on a low note for all groups involved: Dagoska is lost to the Gurkish, an intrigue sees both heirs to the throne killed and an innocent man is blamed for political reasons, the quest for the Seed is an abject failure, and Bethod remains at large in the North.

Last Argument of Kings 
After returning from the west, Jezal is elected as new king of the Union, thanks to Bayaz’s manipulation. Logen returns to the North, kills Bethod and becomes the new king. Bayaz goes to the house of the Maker, and succeeds in unlocking the power of the Seed (which is found in the house). Meanwhile, the Gurkish have invaded the Union and have reached Adua. Logen sets out to aid the Union and a treaty is forged between the Union and the North. During the battle, Bayaz destroys large parts of Gurkish army, together with the city of Adua itself and, in the end, the battle is won. At the end of the book, Glokta, now the Arch Lector, is installed as Bayaz proxy in the Closed council, Jezal is the new puppet king, and Ferro goes in the south to kill the emperor. Logen returns to the North, but is betrayed by Black Dow who becomes king.

Standalone Books
The three standalone books are set in the same world as the trilogy. Some of the major characters are minor characters from the original trilogy while several major characters from the trilogy sometimes also appear in smaller roles, cameos or are mentioned in passing.

Best Served Cold

The first of the standalone books takes place roughly three years after the trilogy. It takes place entirely in Styria, an island continent reminiscent of Italy during the Italian Wars, focusing on the vengeance of a betrayed mercenary leader, Monza Murcatto.

The Heroes

This book focuses on a three-day battle set in the same world as the First Law trilogy, about seven years after events of the original trilogy. Union commander Lord Marshal Kroy leads the Union forces against the much smaller Northern army led by Black Dow. The story features many characters seen in previous First Law novels such as Bremer dan Gorst, Lord Marshal Kroy, and the Dogman.

Red Country

The last of the three is set about thirteen years after the First Law trilogy and revolves around a youthful female protagonist who is hoping to bury her bloody past, but she'll have to sharpen up some of her old ways to get her family back. Her journey will take her across the barren western plains to a frontier town gripped by gold fever, through feud, duel and massacre and high into the unmapped mountains.

The Age of Madness 
The Age of Madness takes place 15 years after the end of Red Country. The Union has begun to see rapid changes with the onset of an industrial revolution.

A Little Hatred 
Takes place 15 years after the end of Red Country. The Union has entered early industrial age, and the North is invading Angland again. New characters are introduced, crown prince Orso (son of King Jezal and Queen Terez) and Savine dan Glokta (daughter of Sand dan Glokta and Ardee West). Angland is inherited to Leo dan Brock, the young and reckless son of Finree dan Brock and her late husband, and in the protectorate of Uffrith, Dogman's daughter Rikke has the Long Eye, the ability (or curse) to see the future. There is public discontent in the Union, aimed against the Banks and social structures, led by factions called the Burners and the Breakers. In the South there is a rumour that the prophet Khalul has been killed by a demon, and there is a civil war.  
In the north, Stour Nightfall, son of Black Calder and nephew to King Scale Ironhand, leads the invasion of Uffrith and Angland.

The Trouble With Peace 
King Jezal dies and is succeeded by crown prince Orso, with whom Savine had an affair, which she broke after finding out he was her half brother. After marrying to Leo dan Brock, the couple starts to plot rebellion against the crown, with the help of the North, which fails nevertheless. Rikke regains control of her Long Eye, and in the mist of Northern attack on the Adua, she betrays Leo and claims the North. 
Leo is saved from the hanging by Savine's confession to Orso that they found out they were siblings, and even through Leo rebellion failed, a new one is ready to succeed, armed with Angland's weapons.

The Wisdom of Crowds 
Revolution is swift and new change is taking place in the Union. The first ones to go are the banks of Master Bayaz. Savine dan Glokta manages to became popular hero and mother of the nation, after her fight with rebel leaders, and her husband manages to gather enough forces to take over the government. After finding out that Savine and king Orso are related, he manages to throw off king, and proclaim his new born son (Savine had twins) as new one. Ex king Orso is hanged, which causes further tensions between him and his wife. New order is being established. At the North Rikke manages to beat Calder and becomes undisputed ruler of the North.
At the end it is shown that the real master-planner of the failed rebellion is Savine's father, Glokta. He wanted to rid the Union of Bayaz's influence. And in the words of his daughter, he put half of the world at fire so he could rule the other half. Bayaz banks are no more, and with them goes his control of the Union.

Major characters
 Logen Ninefingers, infamous barbarian warrior of the North named for his missing finger. Nicknamed the "Bloody-Nine" after losing a finger in battle during a berserker-rage, he strives to turn from the path of senseless violence he has followed for so long. 
 Sand dan Glokta, a dashing young swordsman before his capture and years of torture by the Gurkish. Now crippled, he has become a torturer himself in the Union's Inquisition.
 Jezal dan Luthar, a self-centred, immature nobleman and swordsman training reluctantly for the greatest tournament in the nation.
 Bayaz, First of the Magi, a wizard from an older time, his magical skill is only outstripped by his political savvy.
 Collem West, a common born officer of the Union army. Intelligent and diligent but quick to anger and worried for his younger sister.
 Dogman, a loyal member of Logen's band, a skilled scout with sharpened teeth and an incredible sense of smell.
 Ferro Maljinn, an escaped slave from the south who puts her thirst for revenge over all else. She is part devil.

Other characters
Magi
 Cawneil, a book-loving Magus who tries to remain glamorous despite her age, she had previous relationships with both Khalul and Bayaz.
 Khalul, a Magus who is the religious leader of Gurkhul, he has created an army of Eaters and is Bayaz's bitter enemy.  
 Malacus Quai, Bayaz's apprentice who grows disillusioned with his master.
 Yoru Sulfur, an odd man with Heterochromia iridum, he was Bayaz’s old apprentice. It is later revealed that he is an Eater, although he is still loyal to Bayaz.
 Yulwei, a man with long grey hair and a rich voice. He mainly spends his time in Gurkhul.
 Zacharus, a nature-loving Magus who lives in the Old Empire.

Northmen
 Bethod, a charismatic and ruthless leader. An excellent military tactician who intends to conquer Angland after he has defeated almost every clan in the North. He is Logen's bitter enemy after he betrayed him and his band of men. He has two nasty sons, Calder and Scale.
 Black Dow, a sharp-tongued member of Logen's band who is famed for his ruthlessness.
 Caul Shivers, an amicable Northman who carries a bitter need for vengeance.
 Crummock-i-Phail, regarded "the maddest bastard in the north" he leads the Hillmen (a collection of Northmen that live in the high mountains), he wears a necklace of finger bones around his neck and has his three children carry his weapons around for him (unable or unwilling to tell his sons apart), he seems friendly if crazy.
 Forley the Weakest, a member of Logen's band, nervous and cowardly but well liked for his decency, he acts to keep the group together and stop them fighting each other. 
 Rudd Threetrees, an older veteran member of Logen's band, a skilled and inspiring leader in his own right.
 Tul Duru "Thunderhead" , a giant of a northman and member of Logen's band, he is extremely tall and strong.
 Harding Grim , a masterful archer and member of Logen's band who is well known for hardly saying anything.
 Jonas Clover, once known as Jonas Steepfield and reckoned a famous warrior in The North, he is now renowned as a sardonic do-nothing.

Adua 
 Ardee West, sister of Collem West, bored with her station in life and what is expected of her gender.
 Practical Frost, a practical in the Inquisition, a strong albino with a lisp.
 King Guslav the Fifth, the obese, senile king of Adua, his health is rapidly failing and his mind is slipping.
 Lord Chamberlain Hoff, a loud and impatient man who conducts the duties of the otherwise incapable king.
 Crown Prince Ladisla, the vain and foppish heir to the throne.
 Brother Longfoot, a talented Navigator whose constant talking gets on his companions' nerves.
 High Justice Marovia, leader of the King's Justice, an elderly man and Sult's bitter rival.
 Practical Severard, a practical in the Inquisition whose eyes always appear to be smiling.
 Arch Lector Sult, the elderly leader of the Inquisition, manipulative and greedy.
 Practical Vitari, a practical in the Inquisition, she is a fearsome fighter with fiery red hair.
 Mauthis, a representative of the banking clan Valint and Balk. A remarkably cold individual, he causes numerous problems for Glokta when he presents him with the demands of his mysterious masters.
 Bremer dan Gorst, a muscled soldier and duellist. Despite his size and reputation he has a very high-pitched womanly voice that he's sensitive about.

Adua Military
 Lord Marshal Burr, leader of the King's army, a skilled commander who suffers from indigestion. Mentor to Collem West.
 General Kroy, aloof and by-the-book commander who is the bitter rival of General Poulder.
 General Poulder, a flamboyant commander who is the bitter rival of General Kroy.
 Jalenhorm, Kaspa and Brint, Union officers and the drinking buddies of Jezal dan Luthar and Collem West, they often play cards together.

Dagoska
 Carlot dan Eider, Magister of the Spicers aka "The Queen of Merchants", a beautiful, intelligent and skilled diplomat.
 Haddish Kahdia, spokesman and religious leader of the natives of Dagoska.
 Korsten dan Vurms, the ambitious son of the elderly and incapable Lord Governor.
 Nicomo Cosca, a notoriously treacherous, but charismatic and generally good-tempered mercenary who turns up repeatedly under different employers.
 General Vissbruck, leader of Dagoska's garrison, reasonably competent though mostly he is considered "an ass".

Reception
The Blade Itself was released to very positive reviews. Writing for The Guardian, author Jon Courtenay Grimwood said that "for once, the novel comes close to living up to its publisher's hype", and Strange Horizons's Siobhan Carroll said that "fans of character-driven epics who are willing to take their heroes with a grain of moral ambiguity should add this novel to their 'must read' list."

Reviews for Before They Are Hanged were also positive; Fantasy Book Review stated that it was "hard not to try and read it in one sitting" and that it "does not disappoint".
Best Fantasy Reviews said it was "an excellent book, and accomplishes a fairly rare feat – the middle book of a trilogy that does a hell of a lot more than provide a stop gap between the beginning and the end."

Last Argument of Kings was well received by critics, with Publishers Weekly saying that "readers will mourn the end of this vivid story arc." SFX's David Bradley gave the book a five star review and stated that Abercrombie "signs off the trilogy on a high, interspersing breathless skirmishes with thriller-like moments."

Eric Brown reviewed Red Country for The Guardian and said that Abercrombie was "tipping his hat to the Western genre but continuing his mission to drag fantasy, kicking and screaming, into the 21st century with his characteristic mix of gritty realism, complex characterisation, set-piece scenes of stomach-churning violence and villains who are as fully rounded as his flawed heroes" and concluded that the book was "a marvellous follow-up to his highly praised The Heroes."

References

External links
 
 The First Law at Goodreads

Fantasy novel trilogies
Victor Gollancz Ltd books